The Battle of Acajete was fought at Acajete, Veracruz on 3 May 1839 between insurgents under the joint command of José de Urrea and José Antonio Mexía and 1,600 Centrists under the command of General Gabriel Valencia. The insurgents lost, Mexia was captured and executed, and Urrea fled to Tampico.

Sources
 

History of Veracruz
1839 in Mexico
Acajete